The 2020–21 Championnat Fédéral Nationale is the third-level French rugby union club competition, behind the Rugby Pro D2 and Top 14, for the 2021–22 season.

Teams

Number of teams by regions

Competition format
The regular season uses a double round-robin format, in which each team plays the others home and away.

There is relegation and promotion between both the Rugby Pro D2 and Fédérale 1, the fourth-level competition. Nationale conducts a play-off system similar to the one currently used in Pro D2, with the top six teams qualifying for the play-offs and the top two teams receiving byes into the semi-finals. The winner of each semi-final earns automatic promotion to the next season's Pro D2 if they are eligible financially to do so. The bottom two are automatically relegated to Fédérale 1. The bottom two clubs of the Pro D2 and the top two of Fédérale 1 then enter Nationale for the next season.

There are 26 rounds in the regular season, with each team playing each other team home and away. The two halves of the season are played in the same order, with the away team in the first half of the season at home in the second half. The semi-finals and final take place in May, with the semi-finals being held over two-legs and the final taking place at a predetermined site. At present, 14 clubs compete in the competition.

France's bonus point system operates as follows:

 4 points for a win.
 2 points for a draw.
 1 bonus point for winning while scoring at least 3 more tries than the opponent. This replaces the standard bonus point for scoring 4 tries regardless of the match result.
 1 bonus point for losing by 5 points (or less). The required margin had been 7 points or less until being changed in advance of the 2014–15 season.

Promotion

Nationale to Pro D2 
As noted above, both promotion places will be determined by play-offs, with the two finalists of the Nationale play-offs earning promotion.

Relegation
Normally, the teams that finish in 13th and 14th places in the table are relegated to Fédérale 1 at the end of the season. In certain circumstances, "financial reasons" may cause a higher-placed team to be demoted instead, or bar a Fédérale 1 team from promotion.

Table

Promotion Playoffs

See also
2021–22 Top 14 season
2021–22 Rugby Pro D2 season

Notes

References

External links
  Ligue Nationale de Rugby – Official website
  Midi Olympique

2020-21
2021–22 in French rugby union leagues